The Western Philippines University is a state higher education institution located in Palawan. The university began as the Aborlan Farm Settlement School for the Tagbanuas (an indigenous cultural community of Palawan) in 1910.  It became the Aborlan Agricultural High School in 1928 and then Palawan Regional Agricultural School in 1960. It was renamed Palawan National School in 1962 and became the Palawan National Agricultural College in 1963.  Its name was again changed to State Polytechnic College of Palawan in 1995 by virtue of RA 8012, and in 2004, President Gloria Macapagal Arroyo signed RA 9260 converting it to Western Philippines University.

Curricular Offerings

Graduate school

PhD in Rural Development
PhD in Fisheries
MS in Marine Biology
MS in Fisheries
MS in Rural Development
MS in Extension Systems Management
MS in Agronomy
MS in Horticulture
MS in Agricultural Education
Master in Public Administration
Master in Educational Management
Certificate in Extension Systems Management
Certificate in Teaching Program

Baccalaureate Courses
BS in Agricultural Engineering
BS in Civil Engineering 
BS in Electrical Engineering 
BS in Mechanical Engineering 
BS in Aquatic Biology
BS in Agriculture 
BS in Agricultural Business
BS in Business Administration (Major in Financial Management, Marketing Management)
BS in Criminology
BS in Entrepreneurship 
BS in Environmental Management
BS in Fisheries
BS in Forestry
BS in Home Economics
BS in Hospitality Management
BS in Public Administration
BS in Rural Development Management
BS in Social Work
Bachelor of Agricultural Technology 
Bachelor of Arts in Sociology
Bachelor of Elementary Education
Bachelor of Secondary Education
Bachelor of Physical Education

Pre-Baccalaureate Courses
Certificate in Agricultural Science leading to BS in Agriculture

Basic Education Laboratory Schools
Agricultural Science High School (Senior High School & Junior High School)
Laboratory Elementary School (Grades I to VI)

Branches and Campuses
Main Campus in San Juan, Aborlan, Palawan
Puerto Princesa City Campus in Sta. Monica, Puerto Princesa City
Culion Campus in Jardin, Culion, Palawan
Busuanga Campus in Salvacion, Busuanga, Palawan
El Nido Campus in Villa Libertad, El Nido, Palawan
Canique Extension School in Taytay, Palawan
Quezon Campus in Poblacion, Quezon, Palawan
Rio Tuba Extension School in Rio Tuba, Bataraza, Palawan

References

Universities and colleges in Palawan
State universities and colleges in the Philippines
Philippine Association of State Universities and Colleges
Educational institutions established in 1904
1904 establishments in the Philippines